The 4th Infantry Division (พล.ร.๔.) is an Infantry Division of the Royal Thai Army, it is currently a part of the Third Army Area. The unit is composed of the 4th Infantry Regiment and 14th Infantry Regiment.

Organization

4th Infantry Division Headquarters
 4th Infantry Division
 4th Infantry Regiment
 1st Infantry Battalion
 2nd Infantry Battalion
 3rd Infantry Battalion
 14th Infantry Regiment
 1st Infantry Battalion
 2nd Infantry Battalion
 3rd Infantry Battalion
 4th Field Artillery Regiment
 1st Field Artillery Battalion
 2nd Field Artillery Battalion
 3rd Field Artillery Battalion
 4th Field Artillery Battalion
 4th Cavalry Reconnaissance Squadron
 9th Cavalry Squadron
 4th Combat Engineer Battalion
 4th Signal Corp Battalion
 31st Military Police Battalion

See also
 Thai Humanitarian Assistance Task Force 976 Thai-Iraq
 1st Division (Thailand)
 2nd Infantry Division (Thailand)
 5th Infantry Division (Thailand)
 7th Infantry Division (Thailand)
 9th Infantry Division (Thailand)
 15th Infantry Division (Thailand)
 King's Guard (Thailand)
 Royal Thai Army
 Thai Royal Guards parade

References

Infantry divisions of Thailand
Military units and formations established in 1941
Multinational force involved in the Iraq War